Frederick Vaughan (8 November 1876 – 30 September 1926) was an Australian cricketer. He played eleven first-class cricket matches for Victoria between 1905 and 1911.

See also
 List of Victoria first-class cricketers

References

External links
 

1876 births
1926 deaths
Australian cricketers
Victoria cricketers
Place of birth missing